The 1880 Prohibition National Convention was a presidential nominating convention held at Halle's Hall, in Cleveland, Ohio on June 17, 1880, to select the Prohibition Party's presidential ticket for the 1880 presidential election.

Presidential nomination

On June 17, 1880, the national convention was called to open and was attended by 142 delegates. Reverend Alonzo Ames Miner was selected to serve as the president of the convention. Neal Dow, the former mayor of Portland, Maine, and Henry Adams Thompson were nominated for the presidential and vice presidential nominations by James Black, hoping that other national figures would seek the party's nomination, and were approved by acclamation.

Platform

Although the platforms of the 1872 and 1876 included support and opposition to multiple issues, the platform drafted and accepted at the 1880 national convention only included support for issues relating to the prohibition of alcohol and women's suffrage due to the narrow guager faction, which supported a single issue prohibitionist platform, writing it.

See also
1880 Republican National Convention
1880 Democratic National Convention
1880 Greenback National Convention

References

Prohibition Party
1880 conferences
1880 United States presidential election